Sharku may mean:
 Saruman, a character in J. R. R. Tolkien's novel The Lord of the Rings, called Sharkû by the Orcs
 Sharku, warg-rider chief orc in Peter Jackson's film The Lord of the Rings: The Two Towers and the game The Lord of the Rings: The Battle for Middle-earth II